WC3 may stand for: 
 Wing Commander III: Heart of the Tiger, a 1994 space combat simulation computer and video game
 Warcraft III: Reign of Chaos, a 2002 real-time strategy computer game
 Warcraft III: The Frozen Throne, expansion pack to Reign of Chaos
 Warcraft III: Reforged, the remastered of edition for both Warcraft III: Reign of Chaos and The Frozen Throne
 A common misspelling of W3C, World Wide Web Consortium